Ruckman is an unincorporated community farming community in Hampshire County in the U.S. state of West Virginia. Ruckman is located at the intersections of Ash Ruckman Road (WV Secondary Route 7/4) with J.C. Ruckman (WV Secondary Route 12/6) and Edgar Loy (WV Secondary Route 7/7) Roads south of Augusta and northeast of Kirby. It is named for the Ruckman family that is still prevalent in the area. Ruckman's post office is no longer in operation.

External links
Ruckman Mill Farm

References 

Unincorporated communities in Hampshire County, West Virginia
Unincorporated communities in West Virginia